The enzyme galactarate dehydratase catalyzes the chemical reaction

D-galactarate  5-dehydro-4-deoxy-D-glucarate + H2O

This enzyme belongs to the family of lyases, specifically the hydro-lyases, which cleave carbon-oxygen bonds.  The systematic name of this enzyme class is D-galactarate hydro-lyase (5-dehydro-4-deoxy-D-glucarate-forming). This enzyme is also called D-galactarate hydro-lyase.  This enzyme participates in ascorbate and aldarate metabolism.

References

 

EC 4.2.1
Enzymes of unknown structure